Per Göran Nyman (born 3 May 1974) is a Swedish professional golfer.

Nyman was born in Växjö. An ice hockey goal minder from the age of four, he began playing golf as a 13-year-old because he lived near the Växjö Golf Course, where he looked up to European Tour professional Klas Eriksson. Nyman claimed his second Challenge Tour victory when he won the Rotterdam International Open in September 2005.

Professional wins (4)

Challenge Tour wins (2)

Challenge Tour playoff record (1–0)

Nordic Golf League wins (2)

References

External links

Swedish male golfers
European Tour golfers
Sportspeople from Kronoberg County
People from Växjö
1975 births
Living people